Radivoje Manić (Serbian Cyrillic: Радивоје Манић; born 16 January 1972) is a Serbian former professional footballer who played as a striker.

Club career
After impressing at Radnički Niš, Manić moved to South Korea and joined Pusan Daewoo Royals in early 1996. He scored 13 league goals in his debut season with the club. In the 1997 campaign, Manić was named in the K League Best XI, as the club won the title. He subsequently moved to Japan and spent one season with Cerezo Osaka, before returning to South Korea in 1999. Subsequently, Manić spent the following four seasons with Busan I'Cons (the club was renamed in 2000), before returning to his homeland and joining his parent club Radnički Pirot in early 2003.

In 2004, Manić returned to South Korea and signed with Incheon United. He spent two seasons at the club, before again joining Radnički Pirot in early 2006. Before retiring, Manić also spent half a season with Sevojno and Mladenovac.

International career
In June 1997, Manić earned his only cap for FR Yugoslavia in a 1–1 friendly draw against South Korea at the Seoul Olympic Stadium.

Managerial career
After a successful stint at Car Konstantin, Manić was appointed manager of his former club Radnički Pirot in November 2011. He resigned in March 2012. Manić was also manager of Balkanski, before leaving in May 2013.

Honours
Pusan Daewoo Royals
 K League: 1997

References

External links
 
 
 
 

Association football forwards
Busan IPark players
Cerezo Osaka players
Expatriate footballers in Japan
Expatriate footballers in South Korea
FK Napredak Kruševac players
FK Radnički Niš players
FK Radnički Pirot players
FK Sevojno players
Incheon United FC players
J1 League players
K League 1 players
OFK Mladenovac players
People from Pirot
Serbia and Montenegro expatriate footballers
Serbia and Montenegro footballers
Serbia and Montenegro expatriate sportspeople in Japan
Serbia and Montenegro expatriate sportspeople in South Korea
Serbia and Montenegro international footballers
Serbian First League players
Serbian footballers
Yugoslav First League players
Yugoslav footballers
1972 births
Living people